During the 1995–96 English football season, Ipswich Town competed in the Football League First Division.

Season summary
Having served on the board of directors since 1986, David Sheepshanks was appointed as club chairman in August 1995. In George Burley's first season in charge, Ipswich failed to get back in Premier League at the first attempt, falling one place short of the First Division play-off zone, after failing to beat Millwall in the last game of the season. They were the leading goalscorers in the top four divisions with 79 goals.

Ipswich's biggest defeat of the season was a 5-1 home defeat to Charlton Athletic. Ipswich were 1-0 ahead at half-time but goalkeeper Craig Forrest got injured in the second half when Charlton equalised and was replaced by striker Neil Gregory in goal who went on to concede four. Later in the season, future England international Richard Wright replaced Forrest as goalkeeper for the game against Crystal Palace in January and remained as number one for the rest of the season.

Ipswich knocked Premier League Champions Blackburn Rovers out of the FA Cup Third Round in a replay. Ipswich also reached the semi-final of the Anglo-Italian Cup, losing to Port Vale.

First-team squad

Left club during season

Competitions

Football League First Division

League table

Legend

Ipswich Town's score comes first

Matches

FA Cup

League Cup

Anglo-Italian Cup

Transfers

Transfers in

Loans in

Transfers out

Loans out

Awards

Player awards

References

Ipswich Town F.C. seasons
Ipswich Town